In mathematics, noncommutative residue, defined independently by M.  and , is a certain trace on the algebra of pseudodifferential operators on a compact differentiable manifold that is expressed via a local density. In the case of the circle, the noncommutative residue had been studied earlier by M.  and Y.  in the context of one-dimensional integrable systems.

See also 

 Dixmier trace

References 

Noncommutative geometry